Bohuslav Bílejovský (circa 1480 – 1555) was a Czech Utraquist historian and theologian.

Bohuslav Bílejovský was born in the village of Malín (today part of Kutná Hora). He was ordained in Italy and served in Mělník, Čáslav, Kutná Hora and Prague. He was elected to the Consistory in 1534 and died in 1555.

He is the author of Kronyka česká (The Bohemian Chronicle), published in Nuremberg in 1547.

References 

1480 births
1555 deaths
People from Kutná Hora
Czech Protestants
16th-century Bohemian historians
Czech theologians